Alfred Altenburger (14 March 1923 – 9 February 2008) was a Swiss speed skater. He competed in the men's 5000 metres event at the 1948 Winter Olympics.

References

1923 births
2008 deaths
Swiss male speed skaters
Olympic speed skaters of Switzerland
Speed skaters at the 1948 Winter Olympics
Place of birth missing